Halsön may refer to:
 Halsön, Kalix, an island in the Kalix archipelago of the Bothnian bay
 Halsön, Skellefteå, an island in the Skellefteå archipelago the Bothnian bay
 Halsön, Korsnäs, an island in the Kvarken (Quark) archipelago in the Bothnian Sea
 Hälsö, an island in Västra Götaland County, Sweden